Chris Haughton (born July 4, 1992) is a cadet olympic recurve archer and has qualified to be a member of the Canadian National Archery Team and he is also an archery coach for the Ontario School of Olympic Archery.

In addition to coaching archery, Haughton has qualified for the  2008 Junior World Archery Championships in Turkey and has also qualified for the 2008 Pan American Championships in Venezuela this July.

Career
Before becoming an internationally junior recurve archer, Chris Haughton participated in many other sports including competitive gymnastics and martial arts, which he says was his stepping stool for his strength in archery.

At first Chris Haughton started with Karate at the age of 4 and quickly became very competitive with the sport. Chris Haughton trained with the Dynamic Arts located in Cambridge, Ontario and started winning medals within the club. His biggest achievement in Canada is winning a bronze medal at Joslin's Canadian Open in 1999. Following his family's move to the United States of America, Chris continued karate winning two gold medals, a bronze medal and finished second in Jill Leiker's Midwest Open in sparring and forms.

After finishing karate, Haughton decided to keep his competitive buzz going by starting gymnastics and quickly got into competing in many states across the US, winning various ribbons and medals before his family decided to move back to Canada.

At the age of 12, Chris decided to pick up a bow with the Toronto School of Archery and has never looked back. Chris has trained in Guadalajara, Mexico, Tecoman, Mexico in December and January 2006 – 2007 and numerous places across Ontario.

Personal life
As well as doing archery, Chris also has a love for music and snowboarding (or any board sport you can think of). Chris plays many different instruments including his favourite, guitar, and piano. While Chris isn't shooting his bow or playing his guitar in the cold months, he can be found snowboarding anywhere in Ontario as his love for snowboarding is matching to that of archery. Chris lives with his parents and two sisters in Oshawa, Ontario and enjoys a busy lifestyle taking him to Toronto three times a week.  Perhaps most unusual about his situation derives from Haughton's learning habits, and the fact that he can pick up a bow and shoot almost anytime he wishes. There is no waiting to get the rink, or the field or for the school day to end.

"We were moving around a lot then, so my parents figured it was best to have me home schooled," he says. "I love it. The biggest thing for me is that it allows me, with my practice targets set up at home, to practice archery anytime."

When asked who Chris is inspired by the most, he said "It's definitely my family... and Bruce Lee. (Laughs) I can't say how much I enjoy studying Bruce Lee. I think his work and his life is one that can be greatly admired and I apply much of his thoughts to myself, through his knowledge of the human body and mind. If there's one person (dead or alive) I would really like to meet... that would definitely have to be Bruce Lee. (Laughs)"

Archery Achievements
1st Place = FITA 18 meters. Feb, 4 2007. Caledon, Ontario
1st Place = FITA 1440. May 12, 2007. Caledon, Ontario
2nd Place = FITA 1440. May 13, 2007. Caledon, Ontario
2nd Place = FITA 1440. May 27, 2007. Caledon, Ontario
Gold Medal = Ontario Indoor Provincial Championships. March 2007. Caledon, Ontario
5th Place = Canadian Indoor National Championships. March 2007. Caledon, Ontario
Bronze Medal = Canadian Outdoor National Championships. August 13–17. Caledon, Ontario
Gold Medal = Ontario Outdoor Provincial Championships. September 2007. Sault Ste. Marie, Ontario
7th Place = USA Outdoor National Target Championships. August 2007. Colorado Springs, Colorado
Bronze Medal = FITA 18 meters. Feb, 2008. Caledon, Ontario
Gold Medal = Ontario Indoor Provincial Championships. Feb, 17 2008. Caledon, Ontario
Gold Medalist = Canadian Indoor National Championships. March 2, 2008. Caledon, Ontario
Qualified for the 2008 Archery Junior World Championships held in Turkey
Qualified for the 2008 Pan American Championships held in Valencia, Venezuela

Equipment
Hoyt Helix riser
Win & Win INNO Power Limbs
Easton V-bars
Easton ACE Carbon/Aluminum Arrows
Shibuya Ultima Sight
Doinker Stabilizer
Soma Tab
Neet Quiver

References

External links 
 http://newsdurhamregion.com/news/Sporting%20People/article/86705
 http://fca.ca/Resultsfolder/2008/08Regionalindoor/08Regindoorprelim714-04-08.htm

1992 births
Living people
Canadian male archers
Sportspeople from Cambridge, Ontario
Sportspeople from Oshawa